Chernovskiia is a genus of European non-biting midges in the subfamily Chironominae of the bloodworm family Chironomidae.

Species
C. macrocera Sæther, 1977
C. orbicus (Townes, 1945)

References

Chironomidae
Nematocera genera